USS Sagadahoc County (LST-1091) was a  in the United States Navy during World War II. She was transferred to the Republic of China Navy as ROCS Chung Chin (LST-226).

Construction and commissioning 
LST-1091 was laid down on 3 January 1945 at American Bridge Company, Ambridge, Pennsylvania. Launched on 3 March 1945 and commissioned on 6 April 1945.

Service in United States Navy 
During World War II, LST-1091 was assigned to the Asiatic-Pacific theater. She was assigned to occupation and China from 15 October 1945 to 4 January 1946.

She was decommissioned on 5 July 1946 and struck from the Naval Register on 6 February 1959 after she was transferred to the Republic of China and renamed Chung Chin (LST-226). While being mothballed on 1 July 1955, she was given the name Sagadahoc County.

Service in Republic of China Navy 
In 1974, she underwent refit at the Hai No. 4 Factory.

On 1 January 2011, she was decommissioned.

Awards 
LST-1091 have earned the following awards:

 American Campaign Medal
 Asiatic-Pacific Campaign Medal
 World War II Victory Medal
 Navy Occupation Service Medal (with Asia clasp)

Citations

Sources 
 
 
 
 

LST-542-class tank landing ships
Ships built in Ambridge, Pennsylvania
World War II amphibious warfare vessels of the United States
LST-542-class tank landing ships of the Republic of China Navy
1944 ships